Keralup is a suburb straddling the southern boundary of the metropolitan area of Perth, Western Australia, on the eastern side of the Kwinana Freeway, and consists entirely of a government strategic landholding. The suburb will ultimately contain 90,000 people, with the majority of development being on the eastern side of the Serpentine River.

The name was chosen from a newspaper poll; it was proposed by local Nyoongar leader, Trevor Walley, as it was the name of a pool in the Serpentine River in which he and his friends played as children.

References

External links
Department of Housing: Keralup
City of Rockingham: Keralup

Suburbs of Perth, Western Australia